Damir Čičić is a Serbian pop singer, songwriter, multi-instrumentalist and producer. He lives and works in the Serbian capital Belgrade.

Biography 

Damir Čičić was born on the July 6, 1994 in Prijepolje, Serbia. He finished secondary music school 'Artimedia'  and the Academy of music production BK University. His first public performance was at the Bum Fest in 2008 with the song "Čija si", which won him first place. His second performance was at Sunčane Skale with the song "Boje Ljubavi", which won him 6th place.
He become famous because of singing in Serbian most popular clubs.

Personal life
Damir had dreamed of opening his own recording studio since he was a young man, and now he owns it.

Discography

Singles 
 Progresne su oci
 Ljubavi nema

References

External links 
 Damir Čičić on YouTube
 Damir Čičić on Instagram
 Damir Čičić on Twitter

1994 births
Living people
People from Prijepolje
Singers from Belgrade
21st-century Serbian male singers
Serbian pop singers